Reuben Allen Barker (July 23, 1889 – August 6, 1958) was an American football player and track athlete for the Ole Miss Rebels of the University of Mississippi and Virginia Cavaliers of the University of Virginia. He was then a practicing physician.

Ole Miss

Football
He was selected an All-Southern tackle in 1911 and 1912, "Rube" was the captain of the 1913 team.

University of Virginia

Football

He was selected All-Southern again by Dick Jemison in 1914. He graduated with an M. D. from the University of Virginia in 1917. Barker was often split between his medical studies and football. Barker was therefore often in and out of the lineup. One account of the excitement upon one of his reentries reads "With Allan Thurman and "Rube" Barker, two of the best linemen who ever wore the Orange and Blue colors, back in the line-up, Virginia's chances of emerging victorious over the University of Georgia today are exceedingly bright.

Medical practice
Barker was a practicing physician in Oakland, Illinois.

References

External links

Ole Miss Rebels football players
Virginia Cavaliers football players
American football tackles
University of Virginia School of Medicine alumni
All-Southern college football players
Players of American football from Illinois
People from Oakland, Illinois
People from East St. Louis, Illinois
1889 births
1958 deaths